Pracheen Chauhan, is an Indian television actor.

Career
Pracheen made his television debut with the Star Plus popular show Kasautii Zindagii Kay as Subroto Basu. After that, he did Kuchh Jhuki Palkain, Sinndoor Tere Naam Ka Saat Phere. and Maat Pitaah Ke Charnon Mein Swarg on Colors TV.

He is currently gaining a lot of popularity playing the smooth and insightful Abhimanyu in YouTube Channel Shitty ideas Trending's (SIT)   web series "Pyar Ka Punch" (aka  SIT | PKP) SIT Pyar Ka Punch

He has been nominated for Best Actor both across Television and Digital Awards.

Television
 2001 - 2002 Kutumb as Tushar Mittal
 2002 Love Marriage
 2002 - 2003 Kuchh Jhuki Palkain as Vansh Khanna
 2002 - 2005 Kasautii Zindagii Kay as Subroto Basu
 2003 Ssshhhh...Koi Hai - Vikraal Aur Alkatzar: The Lost City
 2003 - 2004 Kyun Hota Hai Pyarrr as Abhi
 2004 Kya Hadsaa Kya Haqeeqat - Kutumb 
 2005 - 2007 Sinndoor Tere Naam Ka as Antariksh Raizada
 2006 Twinkle Beauty Parlour Lajpat Nagar
 2008 Saat Phere: Saloni Ka Safar as Kshitij Singh
 2009 - 2010 Maat Pitaah Ke Charnon Mein Swarg as Shubh
 2011 Babosa - Mere Bhagwan as Changibai's Husband 
 2011 - 2012 Havan as Keerat
 2012 Chotti Bahu - Sawar Ke Rang Rachi as Lord Krishna 
 2013 - 2014 The Adventures Of Hatim as Prince Hassan of Yaman
 2014 Yeh Hai Aashiqui 2018 Laal Ishq - Maid as Chandar (Episode 29)
 2021 Shaadi Mubarak'' as Vishal Agarwal

References

1967 births
Living people
Actors from Uttar Pradesh
21st-century Indian male actors
Male actors in Hindi television